A stabilimentum (plural: stabilimenta), also known as a web decoration, is a conspicuous silk structure included in the webs of some species of orb-web spider. Its function is a subject of debate.

Origin
It is likely that the use of stabilimenta evolved independently at least nine different times.
Araneus and Gasteracantha make silk stabilimenta, while Cyclosa and the closely related Allocyclosa bifurca make stabilimenta of silk, detritus, and their egg sacs. All those evolved independently from those of Argiope, although some decorations of Allocyclosa bifurca closely resemble those of Argiope.

Form
Although web decorations are common in a number of spider species in the families Araneidae, Tetragnathidae and Uloboridae, they are probably best known from spiders of the genus Argiope. This genus includes a number of species known as the Saint Andrew's Cross spiders, so named for their habit of resting in their webs with their legs outstretched in the shape of an X, the traditional shape of the cross of Saint Andrew. Argiope argentata, more commonly known as silver argiope, are also known for spinning stabilimenta into their web. These stabilimenta can appear as zig-zag lines, and most commonly come in bouts of four creating a center-less X. Spiders in this genus also construct web decorations as a vertical line, and juveniles commonly construct disc-shaped decorations. Other spiders construct round structures covering the entire hub of the web. Azilia vachoni construct conspicuous stabilimenta with attached detritus such as egg sacs and insect carcasses (mostly their prey), and also hang debris such as dried leaves from their webs.

Function
There is much controversy surrounding the function of these structures, and it is likely that different species use them for different purposes.

Originally the decorations were thought to stabilize the web (hence the term stabilimentum), though this hypothesis has since been dismissed because it was found that the decoration is only loosely attached to the web so that the actual influence on the stability could be minor.

Notable is the fact that stabilimentum-building spiders are largely diurnal. It has been suggested that stabilimenta could provide protection to the spider by either camouflaging it (by breaking up its outline), or making it appear larger (by extending its outline). Another hypothesis is that they make the web visible and therefore animals such as birds are less likely to damage the spider's web. More recent work (2016) has leaned toward this latter hypothesis, further finding that food capture was reduced by their presence. The authors note that regardless of function, there is a high cost to building a stabilimentum, and therefore the benefit must be equally large.

The other dominating hypothesis is that web decorations attract prey by reflecting ultraviolet light. Light in the ultraviolet part of the spectrum is known to be attractive to many species of insects.

Another hypothesis is that the purpose of the stabilimentum is to attract the male of the species to the web when the female is ready to reproduce. A limited study carried out in the Calahonda area of Spain in the summer of 1992 showed that there was a positive correlation between the presence of a male in the webs of Argiope lobata and the presence of a stabilimentum. Many other hypotheses have also been proposed, such as thermoregulation, stress, or regulation of excess silk. At least one species has been observed to vibrate the web, while positioned in the stabilimentum, when approached by a body the size of a human.

While many Uloborus species construct stabilimenta, Uloborus gibbosus does not; it usually rests at an edge of its orb and drops to the ground if disturbed. This is thought to support the web camouflage hypothesis. In contrast, the strongly UV-reflecting stabilimentum of the uloborid Octonoba sybotides was found to be attractive to Drosophila flies.

Several evolutionary models were proposed for the inconsistency in function across species. Stark argued that although these hypotheses seemingly conflict, they might not be mutually exclusive, and suggested that we could take a hierarchical approach to model this problem: the predominant factor leading to stabilimentum production (i.e., the main function of the decoration) in each population might be different depending on the prey-and-predating context of that population. For example, in an environment where the food is abundant but predation pressure is high, the food resources are less important than prey avoidance. Therefore, it might appear that the stabilimentum has little to no effect on attracting prey but functions well as a distraction of predators. Walter offered a similar but more specific solution. He stated that the function of stabilimenta might not even be pattern or species specific. Instead, he hypothesized that the visual signaling effect of stabilimenta might be derived from some non-signaling trait that is connected to other aspects of web-building behavior, such as silk disposition; this behavior was then selected preferentially to the specific ecological environment, and therefore would be displayed through different patterns and functions among various habitats.

In Cyclosa argenteoalba, web decorations were found to support Stark's hypothesis above in that they do not attract prey and instead deter predators. This was determined through experiments where the spiders produced longer silk decorations when there was an increased predation risk, but was not affected by the amount of available prey.

Materials
While the most conspicuous and well-studied decorations are constructed entirely of silk (for example in Argiope), some spiders combine silk with other items such as egg sacs and debris (for example in Cyclosa). It seems likely that these decorations camouflage the spider, thus providing protection against predators.

Something different occurs in some species of the golden orb spiders in the genus Nephila. These spiders commonly attach lines of uneaten prey items to their webs. Recent studies have shown that these items help the spider to attract more prey.

In popular culture
It is claimed that E. B. White came up with the idea of a writing spider for his book Charlotte's Web after observing stabilimenta in a spider web.

See also
Spider web

Footnotes

References
 (2004): Web-building spiders attract prey by storing decaying matter. Naturwissenschaften 91: 245–248. 
 (2005): Web decoration polymorphism in Argiope Audouin, 1826 (Ananeidae) spiders: ontogenetic and interspecific variation. Journal of Natural History 44: 3833–3845. PDF
 (2006): Silk decorations controversy and consensus. Journal of Zoology 269: 89–97. 
 (1990): Insect attraction to ultraviolet-reflecting spider webs and web decorations. Ecology 71: 616–623. 
 (2003): Substitution of silk stabilimenta for egg sacks by Allocyclosa bifurca (Araneae: Araneidae) suggests that silk stabilimenta function as camouflage devices. Behaviour 140: 847–868. 
 (2006): Stabilimenta of Philoponella vicina (Araneae: Uloboridae) and Gasteracantha cancriformis (Araneae: Araneidae): Evidence Against a Prey Attractant Function. Biotropica 39(2): 216–220. 
 (1983): Spider-Web Protection Through Visual Advertisement: Role of the Stabilimentum. Science 14 January 1983
 (1970): Stabilimentum of orb web spider, Argiope argentata: an improbable defence against predators. Canadian Entomologist 102: 641–655. 
 (1992): Stabilimenta characteristics of the spider Argiope argentata on small islands: support of the predator-defense hypothesis. Behavioral Ecology and Sociobiology 31: 309–318. 
 (2002): The adaptive significance of stabilimentum in orb-webs: a hierarchical approach. Annals of Zoology 39: 307–315.
 (2018): Tracing the evolutionary origin of a visual signal: the coincidence of wrap attack and web decorating behaviours in orb web spiders (Araneidae). Evolutionary Ecology 32: 159–170.
 (1992): Stabilimenta as parasols: shade construction by Neogea sp.(Araneae: Araneidae, Argiopinae) and its thermal behaviour. Bulletin – British Arachnological Society 9: 42–47.
 (2004): The Effect of Food and Silk Reserve Manipulation on Decoration-Building of Argiope aetheroides. Behaviour 141: 603–616.

Further reading
 (1999): Do stabilimentum in orb webs attract prey or defend spiders? Behavioral Ecology 10(4): 372–376.
 (2002): The adaptive significance of stabilimentum in orb-webs: a hierarchical approach. Annals of Zoology 39: 307–315.

External links
Large format reference photos: Argiope spider orb web with stabilimenta

Spider anatomy